Neon Steeple is the debut studio album from the mononymously known Christian musician Crowder. It was released on May 27, 2014 by Sparrow Records and sixstepsrecords, and the producers were Ed Cash, David Crowder, Jared Fox, Will Hunt, Solomon Olds, Christian Paschall, Gabe Scott and Christopher Stevens. The album sold 22,000 copies in its opening week of sales, causing it to debut at No. 9 on the Billboard 200.

Background
After a long stint at the helm of David Crowder Band, Crowder and his band mates disbanded. Neon Steeple is his first solo musical foray and was released on May 27, 2014 by Sparrow Records and sixstepsrecords. The album was produced by the following producers; Ed Cash, David Crowder, Jared Fox, Will Hunt, Solomon Olds, Christian Paschall, Gabe Scott and Christopher Stevens.

Artwork
The artwork for the physical copy of the album uses a kinegram to animate the text on the album's cover and liner notes.

Critical reception

Neon Steeple met with a positive reception from music critics. Andrea Hunter of Worship Leader rated the album a perfect five stars, indicating saying Crowder "never settles into predictability" and displays "the edge of emotion in glistening pop".  She called the material "raw, yet prodigiously conceived and crafted perfection." At New Release Tuesday, Caitlin Elizabeth Lassiter rated the album four-and-a-half stars, stating "the folk elements and the computer side came together brilliantly". Nathaniel Key of HM Magazine rated the album four stars out of five, calling it "a fresh, relevant and innovative debut release". At AllMusic, Thom Jurek rated the album three stars out of five, noting the music and the musician for its "quirkiness [...] quotient". John Brandon of Christianity Today rated the album three stars out of five, remarking that not everything works well on the album, yet states "'Neon Steeple' is a throwback and a step forward at the same time", which is why "Crowder's ready to lead us there" into a new era of "Christian worship".

Piet Levy of Milwaukee Journal Sentinel gave Neon Steeple a positive review, comparing the music to Avicii's "Wake Me Up" saying "Crowder sticks to folktronica, which blends the warm-hearted, rustic feel of folk with a little cinematic, synthesizer atmosphere." In addition, Levy said "If these songs were less explicitly religious, they'd likely do well on mainstream radio." Jesus Freak Hideout gave three reviews of the album, which were done by Ryan Barbee, Scott Fryberger and Mark Rice. Respectively, their ratings were five stars, four-and-a-half stars and four stars out of five. Barbee stated Crowder is back and "better than ever." Fryberger wrote that "Crowder is no stranger to experimentation, and he pulls it off amazingly with Neon Steeple." Rice said that "Neon Steeple brings forth some of the most creative Crowder concepts yet and excecutes [sic] it to a T". He called the release "everything we could have hoped from Crowder's first endeavor apart from his former band." Christian Music Review's April Covington rated Neon Steeple a perfect five stars, writing that she was "amazed" by Crowder's "crazy, awesome style" of music.

At CM Addict, Andrew Funderburk rated the album a perfect five stars, saying the release "shines brightly" and that "every bit of this project is designed with beautiful artistry and fine detail." Jonathan Andre of 365 Days of Inspiring Media rated the album four out of five, remarking say it features "some of the best songs of [Crowder's] whole entire career so far!" The Front Row Report's Reggie Edwards rated the album eight-and-a-half out of ten, stating that Neon Steeple "should be an instant hit with fans and it won't be long until worship teams everywhere are using some of the songs for their own services." Andrew Greenhalgh at The Sound Opinion gave a positive review of the album, saying "The fusion of the old and the new comes across as effortless in the artist's hands", and that Crowder "reasserts himself as a musical tour de force, making music that is as artistically successful as it is lyrically." At BREATHEcast, Kristen Solis gave a positive review of the album, saying "Only a musical and worship filled creative mind such as David Crowder could pull such an album like this and make it work." Ryan Brymer of Faith Village gave a positive review of the album, saying "This is a good record, but I would just encourage you to leave your expectations at the door."

Awards and accolades
This album was No. 4 on the Worship Leader'''s Top 20 Albums of 2014 list.

The song, "I Am", was No. 8 on the Worship Leaders Top 20 Songs of 2014 list.

Commercial performance
For the Billboard charting week of June 14, 2014, Neon Steeple'' debuted at No. 9 on the Billboard 200, and it sold 22,000 copies. It debuted at No. 1 on the Christian Albums chart.

Track listing

Chart performance

Certifications

References

2014 debut albums
Crowder (musician) albums
Sparrow Records albums